Xinhua Daily was the first public newspaper published in the People's Republic of China by the Chinese Communist Party (CCP). It is owned by the Jiangsu Committee of the CCP.

History
The Xinhua Daily was founded in Hankou on 11 January, 1938. After the fall of Wuhan in October 1938, the paper continued to publish in Chongqing. The Xinhua Daily was the only newspaper published by the CCP during the Second Sino-Japanese War, and was published by the party in order to consolidate public sentiment against the Japanese. As a propaganda instrument, the paper faced competition from the Jiefang Daily, which began publishing on 16 May 1941 under the direct control of Mao Zedong. The Jiefang Daily was created as part of Mao's larger strategy to move the CCP's propaganda arm under his direct control - the Xinhua Daily had moved to Chongqing and was not controlled by Mao. The Chongqing edition of the Xinhua Daily was controlled directly by Zhou Enlai until February 1947.

Political positions 
In the relatively liberal media environment of war-time Chongqing, the Xinhua Daily competed with other publications of different affiliations, as the Kuomintang was not able to exert ironclad control over speech. However hardline supporters of the Kuomintang made serious attempts to stifle the Xinhua Daily as a newspaper of the CCP, such as refusing to grant it legal rights for paper distribution, exerting control over post offices and newspaper vendors, and by implementing a newspaper censorship system that inspected all content published by the paper. 

Other newspapers publishing in Chongqing included the Ta Kung Pao (then an independent newspaper also known as L'Impartial) and a Kuomintang newspaper, the Zhongyang Ribao (Central Daily News), along with many other smaller papers. Along with L'Impartial, the Xinhua Daily published vernacular poetry, compared to the strictly classical poetry published by Central Daily News. Written vernacular Chinese had been associated with the progressive movement since the New Culture Movement in 1917, whereas the classical language was associated with conservatism. Xinhua Daily published a number of poems by the poet Liu Yazi, many of which commented on the arrival of Mao in Chongqing in 1945 for peace talks with Chiang Kai-shek. Mao was then believed to be a proponent of multiparty democracy that Xinhua Daily championed regularly. 

On February 28, 1947, the publication of the Xinhua Daily was forbidden by the Kuomintang. Later, on April 23, 1949, Xinhua Daily began publication with official support.

Coverage 
The Xinhua Daily was formed during the latter part of the Nanjing Massacre and began publishing news reports of the Japanese Army's atrocities after January 1938, particularly after Western reporting on the topic dwindled in February 1938.

External links
 Official website

References 

Daily newspapers published in China
Chinese-language newspapers (Simplified Chinese)
Culture in Jiangsu
Newspapers established in 1938
Mass media in Wuhan
Mass media in Nanjing
Chinese Communist Party newspapers
1938 establishments in China